Jidayu Koizumi (小泉次大夫,  1539 - 1624 December 8) was the Secretary of Water and Hatamoto magistrate of the early Edo period.

1539 births
1624 deaths
Hatamoto
Tairō
Toyotomi retainers
Samurai